Henri Maurice Berteaux (3 June 1852 – 21 May 1911) was the Minister of War in France from 14 November 1904 to 12 November 1905, and from 2 March 1911 until his accidental death on 21 May 1911.

Biography

Berteaux was born at Saint-Maur-des-Fossés.

During his second term of office, Berteaux devoted himself to the reform of the French army service uniform, which included red trousers (pantalon rouge) and blue coats for the majority of regiments, as well as other traditional features such as plumed helmets and cuirasses for the heavy cavalry. Berteaux, convinced that such conspicuous dress was unsuitable for modern warfare, promoted the adoption of a grey-green replacement known as la tenue reseda.  This project was opposed by Berteaux's political opponents, who argued that the new uniform was both ugly and too similar to the field grey service dress just adopted by the Imperial German army. His sudden death led to the abandonment of the reseda project and the French Army entered World War I in August 1914 still wearing colourful and impractical peacetime uniforms.

Berteaux was accidentally killed on 21 May 1911 at the start of the 1911 Paris to Madrid air race, when a monoplane piloted by Louis Émile Train made a forced landing, running into a group of people including Berteaux, the oil tycoon Henri Deutsch de la Meurthe, the French Prime Minister Ernest Monis, and his son, all of whom were also injured. His funeral was on 26 May 1911.

References

External links

1852 births
1911 deaths
People from Saint-Maur-des-Fossés
Politicians from Île-de-France
Radical Party (France) politicians
French Ministers of War
Members of the 6th Chamber of Deputies of the French Third Republic
Members of the 7th Chamber of Deputies of the French Third Republic
Members of the 8th Chamber of Deputies of the French Third Republic
Members of the 9th Chamber of Deputies of the French Third Republic
Members of the 10th Chamber of Deputies of the French Third Republic
Victims of aviation accidents or incidents in France
Victims of aviation accidents or incidents in 1911